WCBX (900 AM) is a Religious formatted broadcast radio station licensed to Bassett, Virginia, serving Martinsville and Henry County, Virginia. WCBX is owned and operated by CSN International.

References

External links
 CSN Radio Online

1960 establishments in Virginia
Radio stations established in 1960
CBX
Henry County, Virginia